Jedoarce)is a village in the municipality of Tetovo, North Macedonia.

History
According to the 1467-68 Ottoman defter, Jedoarce appears as being largely inhabited by an Orthodox Christian Albanian population. Some families had a mixed Slav-Albanian anthroponomy - usually a Slavic first name and an Albanian last name or last names with Albanian patronyms and Slavic suffixes.

The names are: Gjini, son of Gjini; Ivan, son of Gjin; Dujk-o, son of Gjin; Bozhidar, son of Lesha; Todor, son of Brajk-o; Rajk-o, son of Gjin; Pejo, his son; Ivan, son of Gjin

Demographics 
According to the national census of 2021, the village had a total of 16 inhabitants. Ethnic groups in the municipality include:
Albanians 11
 Macedonians : 5

References

External links

Villages in Tetovo Municipality
Albanian communities in North Macedonia